Frédéric Fonteyne (born 9 January 1968) is a Belgian film director. He studied film at the Institut des arts de diffusion in Louvain-la-Neuve. His 2020 film Working Girls was selected as the Belgian entry for the Best International Feature Film at the 93rd Academy Awards.

Filmography 

 Short Films
 1998 Bon anniversaire Sergent Bob (written by Philippe Blasband)
 1989 Les Vloems (written by Philippe Blasband)
 1991 La Modestie (written by Philippe Blasband)
 1993 Bob le déplorable (written by Philippe Blasband)
 Feature Films
 1997 Max et Bobo (written by Philippe Blasband)
 1999 Une liaison pornographique (written by Philippe Blasband and starring Nathalie Baye and Sergi López)
 2004 La Femme de Gilles
 2012 Tango libre
 2020 Working Girls

References

External links
 

1968 births
Living people
Belgian film directors